Sociolinguistics is the descriptive study of the effect of any or all aspects of society, including cultural norms, expectations, and context, on the way language is used, and society's effect on language. It can overlap with the sociology of language, which focuses on the effect of language on society. Sociolinguistics overlaps considerably with pragmatics and is closely related to linguistic anthropology. 

Sociolinguistics' historical interrelation with anthropology can be observed in studies of how language varieties differ between groups separated by social variables (e.g., ethnicity, religion, status, gender, level of education, age, etc.) and/or geographical barriers (a mountain range, a desert, a river, etc.). Such studies also examine how such differences in usage and differences in beliefs about usage produce and reflect social or socioeconomic classes. As the usage of a language varies from place to place, language usage also varies among social classes, and it is these sociolects that sociolinguistics studies.  

Sociolinguistics can be studied in various ways such as interviews with speakers of a language, matched-guise tests, and other observations or studies related to dialects and speaking.

Sociolinguistics in history

Beginnings 
The social aspects of language were in the modern sense first studied by Indian and Japanese linguists in the 1930s, and also by Louis Gauchat in Switzerland in the early 1900s, but none received much attention in the West until much later. The study of the social motivation of language change, on the other hand, has its foundation in the wave model of the late 19th century. The first attested use of the term sociolinguistics was by Thomas Callan Hodson in the title of his 1939 article "Sociolinguistics in India" published in Man in India.

Western contributions 
The study of sociolinguistics in the West was pioneered by linguists such as William Labov in the US and Basil Bernstein in the UK. In the 1960s, William Stewart and Heinz Kloss introduced the basic concepts for the sociolinguistic theory of pluricentric languages, which describes how standard language varieties differ between nations (e.g. American/British/Canadian/Australian English; Austrian/German/Swiss German; Bosnian/Croatian/Montenegrin/Serbian Serbo-Croatian). Dell Hymes is another sociolinguist (and one of the founders of linguistic anthropology) credited with developing an ethnography-based sociolinguistics and is the founder of the journal Language in Society. His focus on ethnography and communicative competence contributed to his development of the SPEAKING method: an acronym for setting, participants, ends, act sequence, keys, instrumentalities, norms, and genres that is widely recognized as a tool to analyze speech events in their cultural context.

Applications
A sociolinguist might study how social attitudes determine what is considered appropriate language use or inappropriate language use in a particular setting. Sociolinguists might also study the grammar, phonetics, vocabulary, and other aspects of various sociolects. Sociolinguists also study language on a national level among large populations to find out how language is used as a social institution. William Labov, a Harvard and Columbia University graduate, is often regarded as one of the founders of the study of sociolinguistics. He focuses on the quantitative analysis of variation and change within languages, making sociolinguistics a scientific discipline.

Studies in the field of sociolinguistics typically take a sample population and interview them, assessing the realization of certain sociolinguistic variables.

A commonly studied source of variation is regional dialects. Dialectology studies variations in language based primarily on geographic distribution and their associated features. Sociolinguists concerned with grammatical and phonological features that correspond to regional areas are often called dialectologists.

Another Method is the Matched-guise test. This technique has the listener listen to a pair of words and evaluate them based on personality and dialect, as some groups have shared views on language attitude.

Sociolinguistic interview  
The sociolinguistic interview is the foundational method of collecting data for sociolinguistic studies, allowing the researcher to collect large amounts of speech from speakers of the language or dialect being studied. The interview takes the form of a long, loosely-structured conversation between the researcher and the interview subject; the researcher's primary goal is to elicit the vernacular style of speech—i.e., the register associated with everyday, casual conversation. This goal is complicated by the Observer's Paradox: the researcher is trying to elicit the style of speech that would be used if the interviewer were not present. To this end, a variety of techniques may be used to reduce the subject's attention to the formality and artificiality of the interview setting. For example, the researcher may attempt to elicit narratives of memorable events from the subject's life, such as fights or near-death experiences; the subject's emotional involvement in telling the story is thought to distract their attention from the formality of the context. Some researchers interview multiple subjects together, in order to allow them to converse more casually with each other than they would with the interviewer alone. The researcher may then study the effects of style-shifting on language by comparing a subject's speech style in more vernacular contexts, such as narratives of personal experience or conversation between subjects, with the more careful style produced when the subject is more attentive to the formal interview setting. The correlations of demographic features such as age, gender, and ethnicity with speech behavior may be studied by comparing the speech of different interview subjects. Interviews with native language speakers can be used in an attempt to study dying languages as well. This is depicted in the documentary The Linguists.

Fundamental concepts
While the study of sociolinguistics is very broad, there are a few fundamental concepts on which many sociolinguistic inquiries depend.

Speech community 

Speech community is a concept in sociolinguistics that describes a distinct group of people who use language in a unique and mutually accepted way among themselves. This is sometimes referred to as a Sprechbund.

To be considered part of a speech community, one must have a communicative competence.  That is, the speaker has the ability to use language in a way that is appropriate in the given situation. It is possible for a speaker to be communicatively competent in more than one language.

Demographic characteristics such as areas or locations have helped to create speech community boundaries in speech community concept. Those characteristics can assist exact descriptions of specific groups' communication patterns. 

Speech communities can be members of a profession with a specialized jargon, distinct social groups like high school students or hip hop fans, or even tight-knit groups like families and friends. Members of speech communities will often develop slang or specialized jargon to serve the group's special purposes and priorities. This is evident in the use of lingo within sports teams.

Community of Practice allows for sociolinguistics to examine the relationship between socialization, competence, and identity.  Since identity is a very complex structure, studying language socialization is a means to examine the micro-interactional level of practical activity (everyday activities).  The learning of a language is greatly influenced by family, but it is supported by the larger local surroundings, such as school, sports teams, or religion. Speech communities may exist within a larger community of practice.

High prestige and low prestige varieties 

Crucial to sociolinguistic analysis is the concept of prestige; certain speech habits are assigned a positive or a negative value, which is then applied to the speaker. This can operate on many levels. It can be realized on the level of the individual sound/phoneme, as Labov discovered in investigating pronunciation of the post-vocalic /r/ in the North-Eastern USA, or on the macro scale of language choice, as realized in the various diglossia that exist throughout the world, where Swiss-German/High German is perhaps most well known. An important implication of the sociolinguistic theory is that speakers 'choose' a variety when making a speech act, whether consciously or subconsciously.

The terms acrolectal (high) and basilectal (low) are also used to distinguish between a more standard dialect and a dialect of less prestige.

It is generally assumed that non-standard language is low-prestige language.  However, in certain groups, such as traditional working-class neighborhoods, standard language may be considered undesirable in many contexts.  This is because the working class dialect is generally considered a powerful in-group marker. Historically, humans tend to favor those who look and sound like them, and the use of non-standard varieties (even exaggeratedly so) expresses neighborhood pride and group and class solidarity.  There will thus be a considerable difference in use of non-standard varieties when going to the pub or having a neighborhood barbecue compared to going to the bank. One is a relaxed setting, likely with familiar people, and the other has a business aspect to it in which one feels the need to be more professional.

Prestige in Pittsburgh 
In a book by Barbara Johnstone, she refers to a study by Christina Gagnon in which she analyzed perceptions of the Pittsburghese dialect from Pittsburgh, Pennsylvania compared to standard English. Pittsburghers were asked to read short passages in their own dialect and in standard English without the Pittsburgh accent, then participants listening to the voice recordings were asked to rate the speakers on level of success, education, if they were neighborly, etc. all based on their voice and way of speaking. The results showed that the participants, who were Pittsburghers, preferred the standard English in terms of social status. The stereotype that Pittsburghers are poor, uneducated, and less motivated showed through in the participants' answers. However, when asked to rate the readers in terms of friendliness, trustworthiness, and community involvement, participants rated the Pittsburghese dialect higher, likely because people generally find more trust among those who sound more like them, as did those involved in the study.

Social network 
Understanding language in society means that one also has to understand the social networks in which language is embedded.  A social network is another way of describing a particular speech community in terms of relations between individual members in a community. A network could be loose or tight depending on how members interact with each other. For instance, an office or factory may be considered a tight community because all members interact with each other. A large course with 100+ students would be a looser community because students may only interact with the instructor and maybe 1–2 other students. A multiplex community is one in which members have multiple relationships with each other. For instance, in some neighborhoods, members may live on the same street, work for the same employer and even intermarry.

The looseness or tightness of a social network may affect speech patterns adopted by a speaker. For instance, Sylvie Dubois and Barbara Horvath found that speakers in one Cajun Louisiana community were more likely to pronounce English "th" [θ] as [t] (or [ð] as [d]) if they participated in a relatively dense social network (i.e. had strong local ties and interacted with many other speakers in the community), and less likely if their networks were looser (i.e. fewer local ties).

A social network may apply to the macro level of a country or a city, but also to the interpersonal level of neighborhoods or a single family. Recently, social networks have been formed by the Internet through online chat rooms, Facebook groups, organizations, and online dating services.

Differences according to class

Sociolinguistics as a field distinct from dialectology was pioneered through the study of language variation in urban areas. Whereas dialectology studies the geographic distribution of language variation, sociolinguistics focuses on other sources of variation, among them class. Class and occupation are among the most important linguistic markers found in society. One of the fundamental findings of sociolinguistics, which has been hard to disprove, is that class and language variety are related. Members of the working class tend to speak less of what is deemed standard language, while the lower, middle, and upper middle class will, in turn, speak closer to the standard.  However, the upper class, even members of the upper middle class, may often speak 'less' standard than the middle class.  This is because not only class but class aspirations, are important. One may speak differently or cover up an undesirable accent to appear to have a different social status and fit in better with either those around them, or how they wish to be perceived.

Class aspiration
Studies, such as those by William Labov in the 1960s, have shown that social aspirations influence speech patterns.  This is also true of class aspirations.  In the process of wishing to be associated with a certain class (usually the upper class and upper middle class) people who are moving in that direction socio-economically may adjust their speech patterns to sound like them.  However, not being native upper-class speakers, they often hypercorrect, which involves overcorrecting their speech to the point of introducing new errors. The same is true for individuals moving down in socio-economic status.

In any contact situation, there is a power dynamic, be it a teacher-student or employee-customer situation. This power dynamic results in a hierarchical differentiation between languages.

Social language codes
Basil Bernstein, a well-known British socio-linguist, devised in his book, 'Elaborated and restricted codes: their social origins and some consequences,' a method for categorizing language codes according to variable emphases on verbal and extraverbal communication. He claimed that factors like family orientation, social control, verbal feedback, and possibly social class contributed to the development of the two codes: elaborated and restricted.

Restricted code
According to Basil Bernstein, the restricted code exemplified the predominance of extraverbal communication, with an emphasis on interpersonal connection over individual expression. His theory places this code within environments that operate according to established social structures that predetermine the roles of their members, in which the commonality of interests and intents due to a shared local identity creates a predictability of discrete intent and therefore a simplification of verbal utterances. Such environments may include military, religious, and legal atmospheres, criminal and prison subcultures, long-term married relationships and friendships between children. Due to the strong bonds between speakers, explicit verbal communication is often rendered unnecessary and individual expression irrelevant. However, simplification is not a sign of a lack of intelligence or complexity within the code; rather, communication is performed more through extraverbal means (facial expression, touch, etc.) in order to affirm the speakers' bond. Bernstein notes the example of a young man asking a stranger to dance: there is an established manner of asking, and yet communication is performed through physical graces and the exchange of glances. As such, implied meaning plays a greater role in this code than in the elaborated code.  Restricted code also operates to unify speakers and foster solidarity.

Elaborated code
Basil Bernstein defined 'elaborated code' according to its emphasis on verbal communication over extraverbal. This code is typical in environments where a variety of social roles are available to the individual, to be chosen based upon disposition and temperament. Most of the time, speakers of elaborated code utilize a broader lexicon and demonstrate less syntactic predictability than speakers of restricted code. The lack of predetermined structure and solidarity requires explicit verbal communication of discrete intent by the individual in order to achieve educational and career success. Bernstein notes, with caution, the association of this code with upper classes (while restricted code is associated with lower classes), where the abundance of available resources allows persons to choose their social roles, warning, however, that studies associating the codes with separate social classes used small samples and were subject to significant variation. He also asserts that elaborated code originates due to differences in social context rather than intellectual advantages; as such, elaborated code differs from restricted code according to the context-based emphasis on individual advancement over assertion of social/community ties.

The codes and child development
Bernstein explains language development according to the two codes in light of their fundamentally different values. For instance, a child exposed solely to restricted code learns extraverbal communication over verbal, and therefore may have a less extensive vocabulary than a child raised with exposure to both codes. While there is no inherent lack of value to restricted code, a child without exposure to elaborated code may encounter difficulties upon entering formal education, in which standard, clear verbal communication and comprehension is necessary for learning and effective interaction both with instructors and other students from differing backgrounds. As such, it may be beneficial for children who have been exposed solely to restricted code to enter pre-school training in elaborated code in order to acquire a manner of speaking that is considered appropriate and widely comprehensible within the education environment.

Additionally, Bernstein notes several studies in language development according to social class. In 1963, the Committee for Higher Education conducted a study on verbal IQ that showed a deterioration in individuals from lower working classes ages 8–11 and 11–15 years in comparison to those from middle classes (having been exposed to both restricted and elaborated codes).  Additionally, studies by Bernstein, Venables, and Ravenette, as well as a 1958 Education Council report, show a relative lack of success on verbal tasks in comparison to extraverbal in children from lower working classes (having been exposed solely to restricted code).

Contradictions 
The idea of these social language codes from Bernstein contrast with famous linguist Noam Chomsky's ideas. Chomsky, deemed the "father of modern linguistics," argues that there is a universal grammar, meaning that humans are born with an innate capacity for linguistic skills like sentence-building. This theory has been criticized by several scholars of linguistic backgrounds because of the lack of proven evolutionary feasibility and the fact that different languages do not have universal characteristics.

Sociolinguistic variation 
The study of language variation is concerned with social constraints determining language in its contextual environment. The variations will determine some of the aspects of language like the sound, grammar, and tone in which people speak, and even non-verbal cues. Code-switching is the term given to the use of different varieties of language depending on the social situation. This is commonly used among the African-American population in the United States. There are several different types of age-based variation one may see within a population as well such as age range, age-graded variation, and indications of linguistic change in progress. The use of slang can be a variation based on age. Younger people are more likely to recognize and use today's slang while older generations may not recognize new slang, but might use slang from when they were younger.

Variation may also be associated with gender. Men and women, on average, tend to use slightly different language styles. These differences tend to be quantitative rather than qualitative. That is, to say that women use a particular speaking style more than men do is akin to saying that men are taller than women (i.e., men are on average taller than women, but some women are taller than some men). Other variations in speech patterns of men and women include differences in pitch, tone, speech fillers, interruptions, use of euphemisms, etc. 

Variation in language can also come from ethnicity, economic status, level of education, etc.

See also

Anthropological linguistics
Audience design
Ausbausprache
Axiom of categoricity
Discourse analysis
Discursive psychology
Folk linguistics
In-group
Interactional sociolinguistics
Jargon
Language ideology
Language planning
Language policy
Language secessionism
Linguistic landscape
Linguistic marketplace
Metapragmatics
Mutual intelligibility
Raciolinguistics
Real-time sociolinguistics
Sociocultural linguistics
Sociohistorical linguistics
Sociolinguistics of sign languages
Sociology of language
Style-shifting
T–V distinction
Category:Sociolinguists

References

Further reading 
Bastardas-Boada, Albert (2019). From Language Shift to Language Revitalization and Sustainability. A Complexity Approach to Linguistic Ecology. Barcelona: Edicions de la Universitat de Barcelona. . 
 

 
Kadochnikov, Denis (2016). Languages, Regional Conflicts and Economic Development: Russia.  In: Ginsburgh, V., Weber, S. (Eds.). The Palgrave Handbook of Economics and Language. London: Palgrave Macmillan. pp. 538–580.

External links

Sociolinguistics: an interview with William Labov ReVEL, vol. 5, n. 9, 2007.

 
Interdisciplinary subfields of sociology
+